The Public Entity Risk Institute (PERI) is a nonprofit organization that serves as a resource to enhance the practice of risk management throughout organizations and communities.

About

PERI provides public entities, small businesses, and nonprofit organizations  with enterprise risk management information, training, data, and data analysis.
PERI’s goal, as stated on their website, is to be an organization that is seen by its principal customers and stakeholders as the independent thought leader and definitive resource in the field of risk management; as a constant innovator; and as a ready source of practical and highly valued products
.

PERI’s stated objectives are to:

- Raise our constituents’ awareness and understanding that managing their organizations’ risk on an enterprise-wide basis is a critical component of success;
- Provide practical, affordable, and easily accessible enterprise risk management education and training resources to help PERI constituents effectively manage risk on an enterprise-wide and community-wide basis;
- Serve as a resource center and information clearinghouse;

The Public Entity Risk Institute is headquartered in Fairfax, VA. PERI is a not-for-profit, tax-exempt organization. PERI is not a membership organization.

See also
Risk management
University of Delaware
Disaster Research
Training
performance measurement

References

External links
PERI main website
PERI Linkedin page
nonprofit crisis management
nonprofit facilities management
nonprofit enterprise
risk assessment and management

Institutes based in the United States
Organizations established in 1996
Risk management